Telemachos Kanthos (February 24, 1910 – November 18, 1993) was born in Alona, a village in the highland Pitsillia area of Cyprus. He was the son of Christodoulos E. Kanthos, a prominent local teacher, and his wife Evgenia Aravi. He is regarded generally as a father of modern Cypriot painting. His work is varied but his favorite subjects were the hills surrounding his village. Some of his most evocative work followed the Turkish invasion of Cyprus in 1974, where he recorded some of the suffering of the displaced persons and particularly those who had lost loved ones.

Sources

Links

Greek Cypriot artists
1993 deaths
1910 births